"Lost in Music" is a 1991 song by English hip hop/electronic dance group Stereo MCs. It was released as the second single from their second album, Supernatural. The single spent a week at number one on the US Billboard Hot Dance Club chart, and also peaked at number 46 on the UK Singles Chart.

Critical reception
Larry Flick from Billboard commented, "Stereo MC's drop some dope (and topical) rhymes on the funk-line hip-hopper "Lost In Music". Remixes by Ultimatum maintain the streetwise vibe of the album version while adding proper club-viable nuances. Love the Hammond organ fills and wriggling bass. Get "lost"." James Hamilton from Music Week described the song as "Jagger-cum-ragga style drawled catchy rumblingly chugging pop rap."

Charts

References

1990 songs
1991 singles
Stereo MCs songs
British house music songs